The European Union Amateur Boxing Championships is a competition for amateur boxers from the European Union and its candidate countries (thus Turkey is a leading participant).  The championships are organised by the continent's governing body, the European Boxing Confederation (EUBC). The first edition of the men's tournament took place in 2003 in Strasbourg, France and the women's in 2006 in Porto Torres, Italy. The men's tournament was held annually from 2003 to 2009 and every four years since 2014, while the women's tournament was held annually from 2006 to 2011 and every four years since 2013.

EUBC events
In 2008 AIBA changed names of age groups (Junior->Youth, Cadet->Junior).

Sources:

Editions

Men

Women

Medals

Men (2003-2018)
As of 2018 European Union Amateur Boxing Championships.

 :pl:Mistrzostwa Unii Europejskiej w boksie

Women (2006-2017)
As 2017 Women's European Union Amateur Boxing Championships.

 :pl:Mistrzostwa Unii Europejskiej w boksie

Combined (Men and Women)

European Union Junior Championships
1.European Union Junior Championships - Rome, Italy - June 6–11, 2006

2.European Union Junior Championships - Warsaw, Poland - May 21–26, 2007

European Union Cadet Championships
1.European Union Cadet Championships - Porto Torres, Italy - June 12–16, 2007

See also
 World Amateur Boxing Championships
 AIBA Youth World Boxing Championships
 European Amateur Boxing Championships

Results Database
 http://amateur-boxing.strefa.pl/Championships/AAAChampionships.html
 http://amateur-boxing.strefa.pl/Championships/EuropeanUnion.html
 http://amateur-boxing.strefa.pl/Championships/EuropeanUnionw.html

References

External links
 http://www.eubcboxing.org/
 Women's tournaments' results
 Men's tournaments' results

 
Boxing competitions
Recurring sporting events established in 2003
Amateur boxing
Boxing competitions in Europe